Ken Dalgleish (7 June 1931 – 7 April 1974) was a Scotland international rugby union footballer, who played as a Wing.

Rugby career

Amateur career

Dalgleish played for Edinburgh Wanderers. He also played rugby for Cambridge University.

He was to later play for Panmure.

Provincial career

Dalgleish played for Edinburgh District in the Scottish Inter-District Championship. He played against North and Midlands and South in the 1954-55 championship.

He played against South the following season.

International career

He was capped for  4 times between 1951 and 1953, all 4 caps in Five Nations matches.

References

1931 births
Scottish rugby union players
Scotland international rugby union players
Cambridge University R.U.F.C. players
Edinburgh Wanderers RFC players
1974 deaths
Edinburgh District (rugby union) players
Panmure RFC players
Co-Optimist Rugby Club players
Rugby union wings